Charles Lempriere "Prairie" Prince (born May 7, 1950) is an American drummer and graphic artist. He came to prominence in the 1970s as a member of the San Francisco–based rock group The Tubes, was a member of Jefferson Starship from 1992 to 2008, and has worked with a wide range of other performers as a session musician.

Career
Prince is a member of The Tubes and was a founding member of Journey along with Neal Schon and Gregg Rolie. However, he quit Journey after a few months, before they made any recordings. 

He has subsequently worked with Chris Isaak (on his first four albums), Todd Rundgren, Brian Eno, David Byrne, XTC, Tom Waits, Paul Kantner, George Harrison, Dick Dale, Glenn Frey, Richard Marx, Bill Spooner, Neil Hamburger, John Fogerty, Nicky Hopkins, Tommy Bolin, Phil Lesh, John Ferenzik, Singer at Large Johnny J. Blair, The Gilmore Project, Negativland, and former Tubes and Grateful Dead keyboardist Vince Welnick.

Prince collaborated with Ross Valory, bassist and founding member of Journey, on a line of patented eco-friendly, USA-made hoodie shirts called MouthMan, where graphic designs of jaws and teeth on the sleeves form a mouth when the wearer "hugs himself".

In 2006, he toured with The New Cars including Todd Rundgren, bassist Kasim Sulton (Rundgren's Utopia bandmate), and original The Cars guitarist Elliot Easton and keyboardist Greg Hawkes. He continues to play with The Tubes and Todd Rundgren.

He was an original member of the reformed Jefferson Starship, known as "Jefferson Starship – The Next Generation" in 1992, and appears on both that band's studio albums (the 1999 release Windows of Heaven and the 2008 release, Jefferson's Tree of Liberty), along with numerous live albums. Prince announced in early 2008 that he was leaving the band on amicable terms and remains available for international performances.

He is a sought-after session musician and recently played drums and percussion on all tracks of Chuck Prophet's 2012 release Temple Beautiful and seven of 12 tracks on Prophet's 2014's Night Surfer.

As an artist he designed the album cover artwork for many artists including The Tubes, Todd Rundgren (1981 album Healing), Journey, Lyle Workman and Vince Welnick's 1998 album Missing Man Formation, among many others. Along with his creative partner and fellow former Tube Michael Cotten, he has created numerous set designs for major artists including Michael Jackson, Billy Joel, Bette Midler, N'Sync, Shania Twain, Styx, The Tubes, and Todd Rundgren. Prince and Cotten have teamed up with choreographer Kenny Ortega on several special events including the 1996 Summer Olympics of Atlanta, the Super Bowl XXX halftime show (which featured Diana Ross singing "Take Me Higher" as she was lifted from the field in a helicopter), Michael Jackson's "This is It" concert, and Shania Twain's residency, Shania: Still the One, at Caesars Palace in Las Vegas, NV.

Personal life 
Prince lived with fellow Tubes member Re Styles from 1973 until the early 1990s. In a 2006 interview with Modern Drummer magazine's Billy Amendola, he referred to singer Diana Mangano as his wife, adding they were not formally married but had been together for a decade.

See also
 The Nuclear Beauty Parlor§Activities

Notes and references

External links

The Tubes official website
Prairie Prince audio interview on RundgrenRadio.com 2007
Prairie Prince audio interview on RundgrenRadio.com 2009
 
 

 
 

1950 births
Living people
American rock drummers
Musicians from Charlotte, North Carolina
Journey (band) members
The Tubes members
Jefferson Starship members
The New Cars members
Album-cover and concert-poster artists
Utopia (American band) members
20th-century American drummers
21st-century American drummers
American male drummers